The following Union Army units and commanders fought in the Siege of Suffolk of the American Civil War. The Confederate order of battle is listed separately.  The casualties are derived from the Official Records.

Abbreviations used

Military rank
 MG = Major General
 BG = Brigadier General
 Col = Colonel
 Ltc = Lieutenant Colonel
 Maj = Major
 Cpt = Captain
 Lt = Lieutenant

Other
 w = wounded
 mw = mortally wounded
 k = killed
 c = captured
 m = missing

Department of Virginia & VII Corps
MG Erasmus D. Keyes (6–14 April)MG John A. Dix (14 April-15 July)

Suffolk Garrison
MG John J. Peck
Assistant Adjutant General: Maj Benjamin B. Foster
Quartermaster General: Cpt George S. Dodge

North Atlantic Blockading Squadron
Acting Rear Admiral Samuel P. Lee
  
9k, 16w, 4m = 29

Notes

References
 Cormier, Steven A. The Siege of Suffolk: The Forgotten Campaign, April 11-May 4, 1863
 Official Records Series I, Volume XVIII, Chapter XXX, Pg 286

American Civil War orders of battle